Vădastra is a commune in Olt County, Oltenia, Romania. It is composed of a single village, Vădastra. It also included Vișina Nouă village until 2004, when it was split off to form a separate commune.

References

Communes in Olt County
Localities in Oltenia